The 2018 German Open, officially the Yonex German Open 2018, was a badminton tournament which took place at Innogy Sporthalle in Germany from 6 to 11 March 2018 and had a total purse of $150,000.

Tournament
The 2018 German Open was the sixth tournament of the 2018 BWF World Tour and also part of the German Open championships which has been held since 1955. This tournament was organized by German Badminton Association and sanctioned by the BWF.

Venue
This international tournament was held at Innogy Sporthalle in Mülheim, North Rhine-Westphalia, Germany.

Point distribution
Below is a table with the point distribution for each phase of the tournament based on the BWF points system for the BWF World Tour Super 300 event.

Prize money
The total prize money for this tournament was US$150,000. Distribution of prize money was in accordance with BWF regulations.

Men's singles

Seeds

 Son Wan-ho (first round)
 Lin Dan (quarterfinals)
 Shi Yuqi (semifinals)
 Chou Tien-chen (champion)
 Anthony Sinisuka Ginting (quarterfinals)
 Ng Ka Long (final)
 Wang Tzu-wei (first round)
 Jonatan Christie (quarterfinals)

Finals

Top half

Section 1

Section 2

Bottom half

Section 3

Section 4

Women's singles

Seeds

 Akane Yamaguchi (champion)
 Sung Ji-hyun (quarterfinals)
 Nozomi Okuhara (semifinals)
 Chen Yufei (final)
 Beiwen Zhang (quarterfinals)
 Nitchaon Jindapol (semifinals)
 Sayaka Sato (second round)
 Kirsty Gilmour (first round)

Finals

Top half

Section 1

Section 2

Bottom half

Section 3

Section 4

Men's doubles

Seeds

 Takeshi Kamura / Keigo Sonoda (second round)
 Mads Conrad-Petersen / Mads Pieler Kolding (quarterfinals)
 Chen Hung-ling / Wang Chi-lin (first round)
 Lee Jhe-huei / Lee Yang (quarterfinals)
 Kim Astrup / Anders Skaarup Rasmussen (second round)
 Takuto Inoue / Yuki Kaneko (champions)
 Fajar Alfian / Muhammad Rian Ardianto (final)
 Lu Ching-yao / Yang Po-han (first round)

Finals

Top half

Section 1

Section 2

Bottom half

Section 3

Section 4

Women's doubles

Seeds

 Chen Qingchen / Jia Yifan (quarterfinals)
 Misaki Matsutomo / Ayaka Takahashi (withdrew)
 Yuki Fukushima / Sayaka Hirota (champions)
 Shiho Tanaka / Koharu Yonemoto (second round)
 Lee So-hee / Shin Seung-chan (first round)
 Jongkolphan Kititharakul / Rawinda Prajongjai (quarterfinals)
 Chang Ye-na / Kim Hye-rin (semifinals)
 Della Destiara Haris / Rizki Amelia Pradipta (second round)

Finals

Top half

Section 1

Section 2

Bottom half

Section 3

Section 4

Mixed doubles

Seeds

 Tang Chun Man / Tse Ying Suet (second round)
 Seo Seung-jae / Kim Ha-na (second round)
 Goh Soon Huat / Shevon Jemie Lai (champions)
 Tan Kian Meng / Lai Pei Jing (first round)
 Dechapol Puavaranukroh / Sapsiree Taerattanachai (quarterfinals)
 Chan Peng Soon / Goh Liu Ying (first round)
 Lee Chun Hei / Chau Hoi Wah (first round)
 Choi Sol-gyu / Chae Yoo-jung (semifinals)

Finals

Top half

Section 1

Section 2

Bottom half

Section 3

Section 4

References

External links
 Tournament Link

German Open (badminton)
German Open
Open (badminton)
German Open (badminton)